Merrill is a city in and the county seat of Lincoln County, Wisconsin, United States. It is located to the south of and adjacent to the Town of Merrill. The population was 9,347, according to the 2020 census. Merrill is part of the United States Census Bureau's Merrill MSA, which includes all of Lincoln County. Together with the Wausau MSA, which includes all of Marathon County, it forms the Wausau-Merrill CSA.

History
Merrill was first inhabited by the Chippewa Native Americans. The first European settlement there was a logging town named Jenny Bull Falls. By 1843, a trading post was constructed near the town; John Faely was the first settler. Within four years a dam, started by Andrew Warren, was constructed over the Wisconsin River. Warren then established the first mill powered by the dam, and other saw mills in the area. In 1870, T. B. Scott succeeded Warren, and the mill soon became increasingly successful. In 1899 the mill burned down. During that time the name of the community was changed to Merrill, in honor of Sherburn S. Merrill (1818–1885), the general manager of the Chicago, Milwaukee, St. Paul, and Pacific Railroad.

In 1881, the Wisconsin Telephone Company began operation, with 20 phones in service. In 1883, the first City Council met and T. B. Scott was named the first mayor. By 1885, the population had risen to 7,000, approximately 3,000 less than Merrill's population today. The railroad and passenger depot was a hub of social activity through the lumber industry's boom years and after. It later became a community youth center, but has since been razed. By 1900, the timber industry was in decline and the community was compelled to diversify its economy.

In July 1912, the Wisconsin River and several of its tributaries flooded from Rothschild to Merrill, destroying several dams (active and abandoned), as well as causing hundreds of thousands of dollars in damage in Merrill.

Geography
Merrill is located at  (45.182569, -89.69559), along the Wisconsin River at its confluence with the Prairie River.

Merrill is located west of US Route 51 on State Highway 64 (Main Street).

Council Grounds State Park is due west of the city.

Demographics

2020 census
As of the census of 2020, the population was 9,347. The racial makeup of the city was 93.1% White, 0.7% Native American, 0.7% Black or African American, 0.4% Asian, 1.0% from other races, and 4.1% from two or more races. Ethnically, the population was 2.6% Hispanic or Latino of any race.

2010 census
As of the census of 2010, there were 9,661 people, 4,175 households, and 2,516 families residing in the city. The racial makeup of the city was 96.3% White, 0.5% African American, 0.4% Native American, 0.6% Asian, 0.8% from other races, and 1.2% from two or more races. Hispanic or Latino of any race were 2.0% of the population.

There were 4,175 households, of which 29.4% had children under the age of 18 living with them, 43.0% were married couples living together, 12.4% had a female householder with no husband present, 4.9% had a male householder with no wife present, and 39.7% were non-families. 35.0% of all households were made up of individuals, and 17.4% had someone living alone who was 65 years of age or older. The average household size was 2.25 and the average family size was 2.88.

The median age in the city was 40.4 years. 23.9% of residents were under the age of 18; 7.2% were between the ages of 18 and 24; 24.9% were from 25 to 44; 24.5% were from 45 to 64; and 19.4% were 65 years of age or older. The gender makeup of the city was 47.6% male and 52.4% female.

2000 census
As of the census of 2000, there were 10,146 people, 4,183 households, and 2,631 families residing in the city. The population density was 1,441.7 people per square mile (556.4/km2). There were 4,397 housing units at an average density of 624.8 per square mile (241.1/km2). The racial makeup of the city was 97.77% White, 0.20% Black or African American, 0.54% Native American, 0.42% Asian, 0.04% Pacific Islander, 0.36% from other races, and 0.66% from two or more races. 1.03% of the population were Hispanic or Latino of any race.

There were 4,183 households, out of which 31.0% had children under the age of 18 living with them, 47.2% were married couples living together, 11.9% had a female householder with no husband present, and 37.1% were non-families. 32.3% of all households were made up of individuals, and 17.6% had someone living alone who was 65 years of age or older. The average household size was 2.34 and the average family size was 2.96.

In the city, the population was spread out, with 25.3% under the age of 18, 8.5% from 18 to 24, 27.5% from 25 to 44, 19.1% from 45 to 64, and 19.7% who were 65 years of age or older. The median age was 37 years. For every 100 females, there were 89.8 males. For every 100 females age 18 and over, there were 84.4 males.

The median income for a household in the city was $33,098, and the median income for a family was $45,860. Males had a median income of $30,789 versus $21,372 for females. The per capita income for the city was $17,429. About 5.7% of families and 9.5% of the population were below the poverty line, including 10.7% of those under age 18 and 15.0% of those age 65 or over.

Government 

The Lincoln County Courthouse, begun in 1903, was completed at a cost of $119,882. Its central rotunda is 32 feet in diameter; second floor offices lead off its balcony. A 48-inch bell and one-ton clock were mounted on the roof tower. It was added to the National Register of Historic Places on April 19, 1978.

Education
Merrill is served by the Merrill Area Public School District. Northcentral Technical College's Public Safety Training center was built in Merrill in 2005.

Public schools

 Kate Goodrich Elementary School
 Washington Elementary School
 Prairie River Middle School
 Merrill High School

Private schools
 Trinity Lutheran School
 St. John Lutheran School
 St. Francis Xavier Catholic School
 New Testament Church Christian Academy

Transportation

Highways

From 1889 to 1921 a streetcar line was operated by the Merrill Railway & Lighting Co., which also operated one of the earliest trolleybus lines in the United States in 1913.

Local transit 
The City of Merrill operates an on-demand bus system within the city limits, known as the Merrill Transit System (formerly Merrill-Go-Round). As of 2019, the fee is $2.00 general and $1.00 for the elderly and disabled.

The community supports a private Blue Jay Taxi service. The service is in part supported by the Merrill/Tomahawk Tavern League through its SafeRide Home program providing over 1,200 free ride vouchers annually, and is locally funded by the annual Lobsterfest event. The program unique to Wisconsin and is considered an effective means by other states to eliminate drunk driving.

Airport
Merrill is served by the Merrill Municipal Airport (KRRL). Located one mile northwest of the city's center, the airport handles approximately 18,600 operations per year, with roughly 96% general aviation and 4% air taxi. The airport has a 5,100-foot asphalt runway with approved GPS approaches (Runway 7-25) and a 2,997-foot asphalt crosswind runway (Runway 16-34).

Parks and recreation

Parks

Community parks:
Lion's Park
Stange Park
Merrill Area Recreation Complex (MARC)
Dog Park
Neighborhood parks:
Streeter Square
Ott's Park
Riverside Park
Stange Kitchenette
Normal Park
Special use:
Athletic Park
Gebert Park
Memorial Forest Wildlife Area
State:
 Council Grounds State Park
Other:
Camp New Wood County Park
Cenotaph Memorial Park
Jack Pines Park
Tug Lake Recreation Area

Recreation

 MARC/Smith Center
 Merrill Soccer
 Merrill City Band 
 Merrill Tennis
 River Bend Trail
 Merrill City Softball
 Merrill Fast Pitch

Historic places

 Center Avenue Historic District
First Street Bridge
 Fromm, Walter, and Mabel House
 Lincoln County Courthouse
 Merrill City Hall
 Merrill Post Office
 T.B. Scott Free Library

Notable people

 Wendy Boglioli, Olympic swimming gold medalist
 Peter B. Champagne, Wisconsin politician
 Walter B. Chilsen, Wisconsin politician and newspaper editor
 Walter Chilsen, Wisconsin politician
 Charles Chvala, Wisconsin politician
 Sheehan Donoghue, Wisconsin politician
 William T. Evjue, Wisconsin politician and founder of the Capital Times
 Hermann R. Fehland, Wisconsin politician
 William H. Flett, Wisconsin politician
 Daniel E. Freeman, musicologist
 Paul Gebert, Sr., Wisconsin politician
 Leo Gesicki, Wisconsin politician
 James H. Hamlin, Wisconsin politician
 Ralph Dorn Hetzel, tenth president of Pennsylvania State University
 Emil A. Hinz, Wisconsin politician
 Paul Jesperson, college basketball player
 Zola Jesus, singer and songwriter
 H. V. Kaltenborn, journalist
 Clarence Kretlow, Wisconsin politician
 Clifford Krueger, Wisconsin politician
 F. W. Kubasta, Wisconsin politician
 Oxie Lane, NFL player
 Myron Hawley McCord, U.S. Representative
 John O'Day, Wisconsin politician
 Fred C. Reger, Wisconsin politician
 Thomas B. Scott, Wisconsin politician
 Donald Edgar Tewes, United States House of Representatives
 Reno W. Trego, Wisconsin politician
 Tom Uttech, artist
 Edward W. Whitson, Wisconsin politician
 James A. Wright, Wisconsin politician

Images

References

External links

 City of Merrill website
 Merrill Area Chamber of Commerce
 Sanborn fire insurance maps: 1884 1888 1892 1898 1902 1907 1913

Cities in Wisconsin
Cities in Lincoln County, Wisconsin
Micropolitan areas of Wisconsin
County seats in Wisconsin
1843 establishments in Wisconsin Territory